The Bombay Hills are a range of hills to the south of Auckland, New Zealand. Though only a small and seemingly insignificant range of hills, they lie at the southern boundary of the Auckland region, and serve as a divide between Auckland and the Waikato region. There is a 19th-century settlement, Bombay, on the old main road south of Auckland, the Great South Road.

Aucklanders and other New Zealanders have a mostly light-hearted "love-hate" relationship. Stereotypically, Aucklanders view parts of the country "south of the Bombay Hills" as provincial and unsophisticated, while the rest of the country sees Aucklanders as brash and arrogant.  For this reason, the boundary between Auckland and its southern neighbours bears great significance. People on both sides of the boundary are as likely to use the phrase "New Zealand stops at the Bombay Hills". The term was adopted by 1990s New Zealand reggae band Southside of Bombay.

Location
State Highway 1 here reaches its highest point between Auckland and Tīrau in the eastern Waikato Region,  to the southeast. Bombay is the nearest settlement to the southern fringe of the Auckland metropolitan area.

Name
The settlement of Bombay and hence the Bombay Hills are directly named after the ship Bombay, which landed in Auckland and brought settlers to the area, originally called Williamson's Clearing, in 1863. The ship itself was named after the Indian city of Bombay (now Mumbai).

Geology
The Bombay Hills are a remnant of a shield volcano from the South Auckland volcanic field, which erupted an estimated 600,000 years ago. The hills are overlain by Hamilton Ash tephra which has weathered to create some of the best soils for market gardening in New Zealand.

The Bombay Hills are the barrier that halts the northward progression of the Waikato River. The hills cause it to turn west towards the coast where it empties into the Tasman Sea near Port Waikato.

Demographics

Bombay Hills had a population of 1,974 at the 2018 New Zealand census, an increase of 354 people (21.9%) since the 2013 census, and an increase of 315 people (19.0%) since the 2006 census. There were 669 households, comprising 972 males and 1,002 females, giving a sex ratio of 0.97 males per female. The median age was 45.0 years (compared with 37.4 years nationally), with 387 people (19.6%) aged under 15 years, 297 (15.0%) aged 15 to 29, 975 (49.4%) aged 30 to 64, and 315 (16.0%) aged 65 or older.

Ethnicities were 85.7% European/Pākehā, 10.3% Māori, 4.0% Pacific peoples, 8.8% Asian, and 2.6% other ethnicities. People may identify with more than one ethnicity.

The percentage of people born overseas was 19.8, compared with 27.1% nationally.

Although some people chose not to answer the census's question about religious affiliation, 51.4% had no religion, 35.6% were Christian, 0.6% had Māori religious beliefs, 1.8% were Hindu, 1.5% were Muslim, 0.8% were Buddhist and 1.7% had other religions.

Of those at least 15 years old, 306 (19.3%) people had a bachelor's or higher degree, and 243 (15.3%) people had no formal qualifications. The median income was $44,200, compared with $31,800 nationally. 465 people (29.3%) earned over $70,000 compared to 17.2% nationally. The employment status of those at least 15 was that 885 (55.8%) people were employed full-time, 261 (16.4%) were part-time, and 42 (2.6%) were unemployed.

Residents
The Bombay Hills has many former athletes as residents including Eric Murray (Olympic rower), Katherine Prumm (World Champion motorcyclist) and Andy Dalton (former All Black captain). Bombay is also the location of a monastery of enclosed Benedictine nuns, Tyburn Monastery.

Walkways 
Since the closure of Te Araroa long-distance walkway through the Hunua Ranges in 2018, it has followed Pinnacle Hill Road for  through the Bombay Hills.

The  Mount William Walkway runs parallel to Te Araroa, linking  Puketutu and  Mount William. It goes through bush with kauri, hard beech and king ferns and has views to Waikato, the west coast and Firth of Thames.

Notable buildings 

 St Peter in the Forest Church (Anglican)

See also
 The Watford Gap, a similar cultural border concept in the United Kingdom
 Jafa, a sometimes pejorative term for a resident of Auckland

References

Volcanoes of the Auckland Region
Volcanoes of Waikato
Mountain ranges of Waikato
Hills of the Auckland Region
Pleistocene volcanoes
New Zealand culture
Populated places in the Auckland Region